The 5th Marine Division was a United States Marine Corps ground combat division which was activated on 11 November 1943 (officially activated on 21 January 1944) at Camp Pendleton, California during World War II. The 5th Division saw its first combat action during the Battle of Iwo Jima in 1945 where it sustained the highest number of casualties of the three Marine divisions of the V Amphibious Corps (invasion force). The 5th Division was to be part of the planned invasion of the Japan homeland before Japan surrendered. Assault troops of the 5th Division were included in the Presidential Unit Citation awarded to the V Amphibious Corps for extraordinary heroism on Iwo Jima from 19 to 28 February 1945. The 5th Division was deactivated on 5 February 1946.

The 5th Division was ordered to be reactivated on 1 March 1966 at Camp Pendleton, California, during the Vietnam War. The division, beginning with the reactivation of Regimental Landing Team 26 (RLT 26), was expected to be fully manned within one year; the 5th Division was never in command of the 26th Marine Regiment (26th Marines) in the war. In December, all three infantry battalions of the 26th Marines were fighting in South Vietnam attached to the 3rd Marine Division. By June 1967, the 5th Division was ready to deploy anywhere. It was never intended that the 5th Division would go overseas. It was a force in readiness. But in February 1968, General William C. Westmoreland, U.S. Army, commander of U.S. forces in South Vietnam, asked for help because of the all-out Communist Tet Offensive. The 27th Marine Regiment (27th Marines), 5th Marine Division, was airlifted out on 48 hours' notice, with 3,700 Marines. In September, it became the first major combat unit to come home from the Vietnam War. The 5th Marine Division formally deactivated on 26 November 1969.

History

World War II
The 5th Marine Division was activated on Armistice Day, 11 November 1943. The division's Headquarters Battalion officially began operating at Marine Corps Base Camp Pendleton on 1 December, at which time men and equipment began streaming into Camp Pendleton. The official activation date for the Division was 21 January 1944. The division had a solid core of combat veterans from the beginning however there were many issues raising the total required number of Marines as the Marine Corps had to provide combat replacements to other divisions and staff the newly formed 6th Marine Division also. Among the personnel forming the new division were Marines from the former 1st Marine Parachute Regiment, the Raider Training Battalion, the Parachute Training School, West Coast, and the Parachute Replacement Company.

Parts of the division began to deploy overseas to act as the reserve force during the Battle of Guam where they were not needed. Because of this they were sent to Camp Tarawa near Hilo, Hawaii for further training.  While there the 31st Naval Construction Battalion was attached to the Division tasked as shore party for the upcoming operation. After more extensive training the division loaded ships and left Hawaii in January 1945. By mid-February they were sailing past Saipan headed for Iwo Jima.

Battle of Iwo Jima

(Presidential Unit Citation: Assault Troops, Fifth Amphibious Corps, 19 to 28 February 1945)

The 5th Division landed on beaches red 1, red 2 and green 1 at the base of Mount Suribachi on 19 February 1945 on Iwo Jima. The division sustained heavy initial losses, so much so that by that afternoon, the 26th Marine Regiment (26th Marines) had to be released as the division reserve. On 23 February, two American flags were raised on Mount Suribachi by members of the 28th Marine Regiment (28th Marines). The 5th Division would fight on Iwo Jima from 19 February until 26 March where they would sustain 2,482 killed in action, 19 missing in action, and 6,218 wounded in action. This was the highest casualty rate among the three Marine divisions involved in the invasion. The 5th Division began loading onto ships on 26 March, finally leaving Iwo Jima on 27 March 1945 sailing for Hawaii.

On 21 March 1945 the 5th Marine Division Cemetery was formally dedicated on Iwo Jima. Chaplains prayed, Major General Keller E. Rockey added a tribute to the dead and Lieutenant Roland B. Gittelsohn, U.S. Navy and a 5th Division chaplain, spoke of friends buried and "the ghastly price of freedom...." The American flag (there since 14 March) at the northern part of Iwo Jima was raised then lowered to half-mast. Taps was played echoing across the dark foreboding ash of "Sulfur Island".

Iwo Jima became an important support and emergency landing field for aircraft based out of the Marianas. In recognition of the 5th Marine Division's sacrifice in securing the island, the U.S. Army Air Corps 9th Bombardment Group named a B-29 "The Spearhead", with elaborate nose art depicting the 5th Division's insignia and the flag raising on Mt. Suribachi.

The 5th Division returned to Camp Tarawa, Hawaii and remained there until the end of the war. After the Japanese surrender they set sail for Japan where they occupied the southern island of Kyushu. The 5th Division left Japan in November 1945 and arrived in San Diego, California the week of Christmas 1945. The majority of the division's Marines were discharged shortly thereafter. The 5th Division was inactivated on 5 February 1946.

Vietnam War

(Presidential Unit Citation: 26th Marines, 3rd Marine Division (Reinforced), 20 January to 1 April 1968)

The 27th Marines and 5th Tank Battalion were activated on 1 January 1966, the 5th Marine Division and 26th Marines on 1 March, the 13th Marines (13th Regiment of Artillery) on 1 May (Headquarter on 5 April), and the 28th Marines on 17 January 1967. The 13th, 26th, and 27th regiments were attached to the 3rd Marine Division (Reinforced), 1st Marine Division (Reinforced), and 9th Marine Amphibious Brigade in South Vietnam until 19 March 1970.

On 27 February 1966, Secretary of Defense McNamara ordered the reactivation of RLT 26 (26th Marine Regiment) and the 5th Marine Division (5th Division headquarters was activated in June) at Camp Pendleton on 1 March 1966. BLT 1/26 (1st Battalion, 26th Marine Regiment) was activated on 1 May, BLT 2/26 (2nd Battalion, 26th Marines) on 1 June, and RLT 3/26 (3rd Battalion, 26th Marines) on 1 July. Each battalion received eight weeks of pre-deployment training, all Vietnam oriented, before moving out aboard navy transports on 6 July, 27 July, and 1 September. The 26th Regiment (26th Marines) was part of the 5th Division, but never came under its command; under base command then subordinate of Force Troops, Pacific, at Twentynine Palms. The 26th Marines were based in Vietnam beginning on 27 August 1966 (2nd Battalion, 26 Marines, 3rd Marine Division Reinforced) until 19 March 1970, but were never commanded there by the 5th Division.

The 5th Division was ready to deploy anywhere by June 1967. It was never intended that the 5th Division would go over seas. It was a force in readiness. But in February 1968, General William C. Westmoreland, U.S. Army, commander of U.S. forces in South Vietnam, asked for help because of the all-out Communist Tet Offensive. The 27th Marines, 5th Marine Division, was airlifted out on 48 hours' notice, with 3,700 Marines. In September, it became the first major combat unit to come home from the Vietnam War. The 5th Division began deactivating its member units on 15 October 1969. The 5th Division was formally inactivated on 26 November 1969, and the men reformed into the 5th Marine Expeditionary Brigade.

Battle of Khe Sanh and Tet offensive, 1968
The 26th Marines participated in the Battle of Khe Sanh, 9 January to 9 July 1968 and was awarded a Presidential Unit Citation for its actions at Khe Sanh from 20 January to 1 April 1968 while attached to the 3rd Marine Division (Reinforced).

In February 1968, General William Westmoreland, the commander of U.S. forces in Vietnam asked for help in Vietnam because of the Communist Tet Offensive. President Johnson then committed more troops to the war effort. On 12 February 1968, the 27th Marines, 5th Marine Division, was ordered to Vietnam and deployed on 17 to 19 February. The 27th Marines became the first Marine regiment to fly into a combat zone in Vietnam. The 3rd Battalion, 27th Marines, which deployed on 17 February, was awarded a Meritorious Unit Commendation for action during Operation Allen Brook at Go Noi Island on 17 to 28 February while attached to the 1st Marine Division (Reinforced). During this operation, 3/27 members earned a Medal of Honor, 2 Navy Crosses, and several Silver Star Medals and Bronze Star Medals with Combat "V"s. In September 1968, The 27th Marines, after serving seven months in country Vietnam, became the first major combat unit to come home from Vietnam. All first tour personnel were reassigned to other units in order to complete their tours.

26th Marines 
1st Battalion, 26th Marines: Activated on 1 May 1966. Moved out of Camp Pendleton on 6 July and was assigned to the 7th Fleet's Special Landing Force on 5 August. It participated in the 26th Marines first combat operation in Vietnam off the assault helicopter carrier USS Iwo Jima during Operation Deckhouse III and taking the regiments first four casualties. The 1/26 Marines was based in South Vietnam on 27 September 1966.

2nd Battalion, 26th Marines: Activated on 1 June 1966. The 2/26 Marines arrived in Da Nang, South Vietnam on 27 August 1966.

3rd Battalion, 26th Marines: Activated on 1 July 1966. Moved out of Camp Pendleton on 2 September and was assigned to the 7th Fleet's Special Landing Force on 4 October. The 3/26 Marines was based in Vietnam on 11 December 1966.

27th and 28th Marines
The 27th Marine Regiment (27th Marines), 5th Marine Division, would receive orders on 12 February 1968 to deploy to Vietnam, with 1/27 Marines arriving at Da Nang, South Vietnam on 23 February. On 2, 1 April/27 Marines was attached to the 1st Marine Division. The 28th Marine Regiment (28th Marines) would remain at Camp Pendleton throughout the Vietnam War.

13th Marines
Kilo Battery, 13th Marine Regiment (13th Marines), landed at the mouth of the Cua Viet River in Vietnam in May 1967. Alpha, Bravo, and Charlie 1/13 were present at the Battle of Khe Sanh in 1968.

5th Tank Battalion
WWII

In May 1944 the 5th Tank Battalion commanded by Lt. Colonel William R. Collins was posted to Schofield Barracks in the Territory of Hawaii.  They were attached to the Army's Chemical Warfare Service CENPAC under Col. Unmacht (USA).   They were part of a top secret program to develop flamethrowing tanks with Seabees from the 117th CB and the 43rd Chemical Laboratory Company.  Eventually the Battalion would get four M4-3A Sherman's modified with a CB-H1-H2 flamethrowers for Iwo Jima.  Those tanks used between 5–10,000 gallons of napalm per day near the end of the battle.  Early in the assault it was decided that the tanks from all three Divisions would be consolidated into a Regimental command under Lt. Colonel Collins.

5th Marine CB-H1 in action on D+22,
 The 5th tank Battalion received a Presidential Unit Citation.

Vietnam

The 5th Tank Battalion (RLT 26, RLT 27, and RLT 28) was attached to the 1st Marine Division (Reinforced) and staged in the Philippines from Camp Pendleton, California. The unit provided mission fire control support at every strategic hill in South Vietnam, and received two Presidential Unit Citations (PUC) for extraordinary heroism in the battles at Khe Sanh and Hue City. Ord & Maint Co. suffered heavy losses on Hill 88 as 21 Marines perished from mortar fire falling on the 105mm ordnance bunker. This was the highest number of casualties suffered in a single day by the 5th Tank Battalion during the Vietnam War.

Note: Only A Company and B Company were sent to Vietnam with the 26th and 27th Marine Regiments, (Capt. Robert Johnstone was the OIC).  C Company and D Company remained in garrison at Camp Pendleton. As the result of President Nixon's draw down in troop strength Bravo Company returned to Camp Pendleton in September 1968.

Casualties

World War II
 Killed in Action/Died of Wounds/Missing in Action – 2,501
 Wounded in Action – 5,948
 Total Casualties– 8,363

Vietnam War
 Killed in Action/Died of Wounds – N/A
 Wounded in Action – N/A
 Total Casualties– N/A

Medal of Honor recipients

Fifteen Marines and 2 Navy corpsmen assigned to the 5th Marine Division were awarded the Medal of Honor for World War II (Iwo Jima). Twelve were posthumously awarded. Two Marines of the 26th and 27th Marines were posthumously awarded the Medal of Honor for the Vietnam War.

World War II
 Robert Hugo Dunlap
 William G. Harrell
 Jacklyn Harrell Lucas
 Franklin E. Sigler
 George Wahlen, USN
Posthumous
 Charles J. Berry
 William R. Caddy
 Joseph R. Julian
 James D. LaBelle
 Jack Lummus
 Harry L. Martin
 George Phillips
 Donald J. Ruhl
 Tony Stein
 William G. Walsh
 Jack Williams
 John H. Willis, USN

Vietnam War
Posthumous
 Robert C. Burke (attached to 1st Marine Division)
 Karl G. Taylor Sr. (attached to 3rd Marine Division)

Unit awards

World War II
 Presidential Unit Citation: Assault Troops, V Amphibious Corps (Reinforced), 19 to 28 February 1945 (Battle of Iwo Jima): (5th Marine Division) 
 Navy Unit Commendation: Support Troops, V Amphibious Corps (Reinforced), 19 to 28 February 1945 (Battle of Iwo Jima): (5th Marine Division)

Vietnam War
 Presidential Unit Citation: 26th Marines (Reinforced), 3rd Marine Division (Reinforced), 20 January to 1 April 1968 (Battle of Khe Sanh)
 Presidential Unit Citation: 3rd Marine Division, 8 March 1965 to 15 September 1967: (26th Marines)
 Presidential Unit Citation: 1st Marine Division (Reinforced), 14 March 1967 to October 1969: (5th Tank Battalion)

Organization

World War II

Vietnam War
 26th Marine Regiment
 27th Marine Regiment
 28th Marine Regiment
 13th Marine Regiment
 3rd Military Police Battalion
 5th Military Police Battalion
 5th Tank Battalion
 Communications Company Headquarters Battalion

See also

 Flags of our Fathers
 List of United States Marine Corps divisions
 Organization of the United States Marine Corps
 Marine Corps War Memorial

Notes

References

Bibliography

 Mandel, Lee, Capt. USN Ret. (2015). Unlikely Warrior: A Pacifist Rabbi's Journey from the Pulpit to Iwo Jima. Pelican Publishing Company. .

Web
 http://www.facebook.com/group.php?gid=54804399619 (Facebook Group: Title: "5th Marine Division Group" – More Photos)
 http://www.jacklummus.com/
 Battle Honors of the six Marine Divisions in World War II
 The Fifth Marine Division
 B-29 The Spearhead

External links 
 

Divisions of the United States Marine Corps
5
Military units and formations established in 1943
5th Marine Division
United States Marine Corps divisions during World War II
Military units and formations of the United States Marine Corps in World War II